Thecturota is a genus of beetles belonging to the family Staphylinidae.

The species of this genus are found in Europe and Northern America.

Species:
 Thecturota antillarum Pace, 1987 
 Thecturota capito Casey, 1893

References

Staphylinidae
Staphylinidae genera